Dar Tama is one of three departments in Wadi Fira, a region of Chad. The population consists primarily of non-Arab tribes. Dar Tama is the historical home of the Tama, who make up the majority of the population. The Zaghawa make up a significant minority and migrated during the Sahelian drought in the 1980s. Both are non-Arab tribes. Chadian president Idriss Déby is from the Zaghawa tribe.

Sub-prefectures 
Loug Chari  is divided into four sub-prefectures:

 Guéréda
 Kolonga
 Sirim Birké (Serim Birké)

References

Departments of Chad
Wadi Fira Region